Black Square is a 1992 Russian crime film directed by Yuri Moroz.

Plot 
The film tells about operatives who, at the risk of their lives, are investigating a murder in which the highest echelons of the military leadership of Russia are involved.

Cast 
 Dmitry Kharatyan
 Vitali Solomin
 Elena Yakovleva
 Vasiliy Lanovoy
 Tatyana Kravchenko
 Armen Dzhigarkhanyan		
 Emmanuil Vitorgan
 Alla Balter
 Darya Moroz
 Vladimir Talashko

References

External links 
 

1992 films
1990s Russian-language films
1992 crime drama films
Russian crime drama films
Russian mystery films